The 1976–77 I-Divisioona season was the third season of the I-Divisioona, the second level of Finnish ice hockey. 10 teams participated in the league, and Kärpät Oulu won the championship. Kärpät Oulu and Vaasan Sport qualified for the promotion/relegation round of the SM-liiga.

Regular season

External links
 Season on hockeyarchives.info

I-Divisioona seasons
2
Fin